A Long Journey may refer to:

 A Long Journey (1967 film)
 A Long Journey (2011 film)
 A Long Journey, a 1998 album by Ophthalamia

See also
 Long Journey Home (disambiguation)